This is a list of Members of Parliament in Kent, covering each of the seats in the English county, except Kent (to 1832), East Kent (1832–1885),  West Kent (1832–1885), and Mid Kent (1868–1885).

Ashford

The Ashford constituency was created in 1885.

Canterbury
The Canterbury constituency was created in 1295.

MPs 1660–1880

MPs since 1885 

Constituency representation restored and reduced to one (1885)

Chatham and Aylesford
The Chatham and Aylesford constituency was created in 1997

Dartford
The Dartford constituency was created in 1885

MPs 1885–1945

MPs since 1945 
The constituency was split in 1945, with half becoming the new Bexley seat

Dover

Faversham and Mid Kent
The Faversham and Mid Kent constituency was created in 1997

Folkestone and Hythe
The Folkestone and Hythe constituency was created in 1950

Gillingham
The Gillingham constituency was created in 1918

Gravesham
The Gravesham constituency was created in 1983

Maidstone and The Weald
The Maidstone and The Weald constituency, originally named "Maidstone", was created in 1560. Up until 1885 it elected two MPs. In 1997 the name was changed to "Maidstone and The Weald".

MPs 1660–1885

MPs 1885–present

Medway
The Medway constituency was created in 1885

The constituency was abolished in 1918 and recreated in 1983

North Thanet
The North Thanet constituency was created in 1983

Sevenoaks
The Sevenoaks constituency was created in 1885

Sittingbourne and Sheppey
The Sittingbourne and Sheppey constituency was created in 1997

South Thanet

The South Thanet constituency was created in 1983

Tonbridge and Malling
The Tonbridge and Malling constituency was created in 1974

Tunbridge Wells
The Tunbridge Wells constituency was created in 1974

See also
List of parliamentary constituencies in Kent
West Kent (UK Parliament constituency)
Mid Kent (historic UK Parliament constituency)
Mid Kent (UK Parliament constituency)
East Kent (UK Parliament constituency)

Politics of Kent
Kent
Members of Parliament